Boko-Songho  is a district in the Bouenza Region of southern Republic of the Congo. The capital lies at Boko-Songho.

Towns and villages

The villages of Boko-Songho district are: Minga, Hidi, Mankala, Nzangui, Kinzambi (Tipheret), Kabadissou, Manzakala, Nsoukou Bouadi, Loudima, Kisenga, Bouaboua, Louhete, Manzaou, Kiteka, Kingoma, Ntoto-Hola 1&2, La Louamba...from the south and Badondo's villages from the north.

See also
Boko District

References

Bouenza Department
Districts of the Republic of the Congo